State Highway 159 (SH 159) is a  state highway in far southern Colorado. SH 159's southern terminus is a continuation as New Mexico State Road 522 (NM 522) at the New Mexico state line, and the northern terminus is at U.S. Route 160 (US 160) near Fort Garland.

Route description
SH 159 starts in the south at the New Mexico state line where the road becomes NM 522 which heads south towards Taos, NM. From the state line the road heads north to meet US 160 at its north end just outside Fort Garland. There is only one town along the route, San Luis, which is at the road's midpoint. San Luis is also the site of SH 159's junction with SH 142, the only significant junction along the route.

History
The route was established in the 1920s and paved by 1938. The route remains as it was when established.

Major intersections

References

External links

159
Transportation in Costilla County, Colorado